Elizabeth Jackson (born October 27, 1977) is an American female former track and field athlete who specialized in the 3000 meters steeplechase. She represented her country at the 2005 World Championships in Athletics, placing ninth in the final. She was a four-time American national champion in the steeplechase, winning in 1999, 2000, 2002 and 2005. She also competed at the 1998 and 2001 Goodwill Games. She broke the United States record in the steeplechase several times.

Born in Salt Lake City, Jackson attended East High School and took part in track there, taking state-level titles in 800 meters and mile run. She competed collegiately for Brigham Young University's BYU Cougars team while studying for a business marketing major. She earned six All-American honors in track and cross country while there, as well as Academic All-America selection. She was the first ever winner of the NCAA women's steeplechase. She placed third in the 5000 metres at the 2000 NCAA Indoor Championships.

She stopped competing at elite level after 2005 and in 2009 set up her own search engine optimisation company.

International competitions

National titles
USA Outdoor Track and Field Championships
3000 m steeplechase: 1999, 2000, 2002
NCAA Women's Division I Outdoor Track and Field Championships
3000 m steeplechase: 2001

References

External links

1977 births
Living people
Track and field athletes from Salt Lake City
American female steeplechase runners
BYU Cougars women's track and field athletes
World Athletics Championships athletes for the United States
Competitors at the 1998 Goodwill Games
Competitors at the 2001 Goodwill Games